The 1989–90 Connecticut Huskies men's basketball team represented the University of Connecticut in the 1989–90 collegiate men's basketball season. The Huskies completed the season with a 31–6 overall record. The Huskies were members of the Big East Conference where they finished with a 12–4 record. They made it to the Elite Eight in the 1990 NCAA Division I men's basketball tournament. Many consider this season the one where UConn broke out and became a national power, consistently being at the top of the conference in the 1990s and winning their first of four National Titles in 1999. The Huskies played their home games at Hugh S. Greer Field House and Harry A. Gampel Pavilion in Storrs, Connecticut as well as the Hartford Civic Center in Hartford, Connecticut, and they were led by fourth-year head coach Jim Calhoun.

Schedule 

|-
!colspan=12 style=""| Regular Season

|-
!colspan=12 style=""| Big East tournament

|-
!colspan=12 style=""| NCAA tournament

Schedule Source:

NBA Draft

References 

UConn Huskies men's basketball seasons
Connecticut Huskies
Connecticut
1989 in sports in Connecticut
1990 in sports in Connecticut